This article summarizes the events, album releases, and album release dates in hip hop music for the year 2012.

Events

January
Cory Gunz was arrested for possessing a loaded firearm.
Azealia Banks signs to Universal Music.

February
 Kanye West won four Grammy Awards for Best Rap Song, Best Rap Album, Best Rap Performance, and Best Rap/Sung Collaboration, while Jay-Z and Kid Cudi have won one each.
 Philthy Rich and two more people are arrested for supposedly owning a stolen Bentley vehicle.
 Tyga's major label debut album, Careless World: Rise of the Last King was thought to be taken off the shelves due to an unauthorized usage of Martin Luther King, Jr.'s last speech.  However, the issue is resolved and the released date would go as planned.
 Bizarre has left D12, leaving the group with five members.

March
 T.I. announces he signed Iggy Azalea, Chip and Trae Tha Truth to Grand Hustle Records.
 An SUV that Young Buck was a passenger in, was shot at 11 times, but the rapper was not injured.
 MTV announces that Top Dawg Entertainment, a Los Angeles-based independent record label, have closed a joint venture deal with Interscope Records and Aftermath Entertainment. Under the new deal, Black Hippy member Kendrick Lamar's debut studio album, good kid, m.A.A.d city will be jointly released via Top Dawg/Interscope/Aftermath while releases from the rest of Black Hippy (Ab-Soul, Jay Rock and Schoolboy Q) will be distributed via Top Dawg/Interscope.
 Tyga's tour bus was shot at several times in Omaha, Nebraska, but the rapper was not injured.
 Kon Artis has left D12, leaving the group with 4 members.
 March 9 marked the 15th anniversary of the death of The Notorious B.I.G.

April
 Q-Tip has announced his signing to Kanye West's G.O.O.D. Music/Def Jam.
 At this year's Coachella Music Festival, Dr. Dre and Snoop Dogg surprised the audience with a performance from 2Pac via hologram image.
 Former D12 member Mr. Porter announced his debut album.

May
 Adam Yauch (known as MCA), one of the founding members of Beastie Boys, died on May 4 aged 47.
 Young Buck will be heading to prison for two months for gun possession.
 2 Chainz was arrested for possessing a set of brass knuckles.
 In the song "Exodus 23:1", Pusha T insulted Cash Money Records, igniting a beef between him and Lil Wayne.
 Lupe Fiasco and Pete Rock's beef over the former remaking the latter's beat from "T.R.O.Y." for "Around My Way (Freedom Ain't Free)."
 Eminem announced that he is working on his eighth studio album.
Shawn Chrystopher signs to Timbaland Productions.

June
Nicki Minaj was pulled from performing at New York's Hot 97 Summer Jam because on-air DJ Peter Rosenberg called her song "Starships" bullshit, wack and corny.
Lil Phat died on June 7 after he was shot multiple times in Atlanta.
 MTV is reporting that on June 16, Chicago rapper Chief Keef signed with Interscope Records.
 At W.i.P. nightclub the scuffle between Chris Brown and Drake continues to be under investigation, though both artists are saying they had nothing to do with the violent incident that left many bloodied and injured. Now Philly rapper Meek Mill, who was also present during the late night fight, has come forward to back up their claims that they did not instigate the bottle-throwing brawl.
 Funk Volume signs Jarren Benton.

July
 Member of OFWGKTA Frank Ocean published an open letter on his Tumblr blog on July 4, recounting unrequited feelings he had for a man when he was 19 years old, citing it as his first true love. Members of the hip hop industry generally responded positively to the announcement. Business magnate Russell Simmons wrote a short congratulatory article in Global Grind, and support was voiced by Beyoncé and Jay-Z. Tyler, The Creator also tweeted his support for Ocean, along with other members of OFWGKTA.
Rockie Fresh signs to Maybach Music Group.

August
 Philthy Rich is shot 3 times but is released from a hospital the day after the shooting.
 Hip Hop executive Chris Lighty, founder of Violator and who managed and worked with artists like 50 Cent and Busta Rhymes, was found dead due to possible suicide.
Freeway signs to Babygrande Records.
Max B's appeal from his 75-year prison sentence that occurred in 2009 was denied.
Rittz signs to Strange Music.
Caskey signs to Cash Money

September
Lil Wayne has officially passed Rock n Roll legend Elvis Presley with the most appearances on the Billboard 100 with 109 (42 as a solo artist, 67 as a featured artist).
Jay-Z announced the opening of the Barclays Center with a concert, including a hologram of Notorious B.I.G. and a new verse.
50 Cent and Fat Joe have ended their feud, appearing on stage together at the 2012 BET Hip Hop Awards. Also on BET Hip Hop Awards, 50 Cent and his crew G-Unit have been involved into a fight with Maybach Music Group's member Gunplay.

October
After all problems at BET Hip Hop Awards, 50 Cent started a beef with French Montana after Bad Boy's rapper commented negatively about 50 Cent's career. G-Unit's boss responded on Twitter calling French Montana a "hoe".
50 Cent appeared in a video wearing Gunplay's chain of Maybach Music Group while bowling.
Nelly was detained in Texas after cops find heroin and 10 pounds of weed on his tour bus.
P. Diddy suffered injuries to his neck, ribs, and collarbone, following a car accident on October 24.
Lil Wayne suffered multiple seizures on a flight to Texas.

December
Both Young Jeezy's label CTE (Corporate Thugz Entertainment) and Rick Ross's Maybach Music Group merge with Atlantic Records.
Both Jay-Z and Kanye West each have six Grammy nominations for the 2013 Grammy Awards, Nas has four, Drake and 2 Chainz each have three, Andre 3000, Big Sean, Pusha T, Lil Wayne, and Wiz Khalifa each have two.
The Notorious B.I.G. Autopsy was leaked by the Los Angeles Police Department and published by TMZ.  The Los Angeles Police Department apologized for the leaked to Voletta Wallace and Biggie's Family.
On December 24, 2012, it was announced that Capital STEEZ, a close friend of Joey Badass and founder of Pro Era, died from a suspected suicide.

Released albums

Highest first-week sales

Highest-charting singles

Highest critically reviewed albums

Metacritic

AnyDecentMusic?

See also
 2011 in hip hop music
 2013 in hip hop music

References

2010s in hip hop music
Hip hop
Hip hop music by year